Ludwigia polycarpa, common names many-fruited false-loosestrife and false loosestrife seedbox, is a plant found in North America. It is listed as a special concern and believed extirpated in Connecticut,  and as endangered in Massachusetts, Pennsylvania and Vermont.

References

Flora of North America
polycarpa